Hills, Western Australia may refer to:

Perth Hills
Wongan Hills, Western Australia